Buje is a small village in the Municipality of Pivka in the Inner Carniola region of Slovenia. The village is situated in the valley of the Reka River, between the ravines of the Rimače and Žermejnica streams. The Pivka-Divača railway line runs nearby. They are also accessible by road from the Reka valley.

The local church in the settlement is dedicated to Saint Florian and belongs to the Parish of Košana.

History 

The village was first mentioned in the medieval urban register for Senožeče in 1460. They were mentioned for the second time in 1498 in the urbarium for Postojna. At the time Buje were officially valled Vuyach or Wuiach. Until the territorial reorganization in Slovenia, Buje remained part of the old municipality of Postojna.

On Buje there is a church dedicated to St. Florian, who is the patron saint of firefighters. The sprinkler stone bears the year 1670, and there was a 1705 inscription carved on the door, which was written during the renovation of the altar and the entrance. The church was renovated again in 2005.

References

External links 

Buje on Geopedia
Buje Local Community site

Populated places in the Municipality of Pivka